The ancient Roman state encountered various kinds of external and internal emergencies. They had various responses to those issues.

When faced with an emergency, the early Republic appointed dictators who would take charge of the emergency with relatively loose bounds of action and resolve that crisis before resigning. Through the Republic, various decrees allowed dictators and magistrates to conduct emergency levies of troops and suspend public business. During the late Republic, the senatus consultum ultimum emerged, where the Senate would urge the magistrates to break the laws to ensure the safety of the state, usually with the promise of political and legal cover if the magistrates were later brought to account. A further decree was introduced where the Senate stripped targets of their citizenship rights, allowing magistrates to treat them as foreign enemies.

The emergence of the Imperial period and autocratic rule made most the republican decrees obsolete. The problems of public order they were meant to resolve were themselves resolved by the introduction of police forces. Various people, usually deposed emperors or provincial rebels, continued to be declared public enemies (hostis), but as the use of force became a normal part of imperial rule, various decrees authorising that use of force became unnecessary.

During the Republic 

During the Roman Republic, the state had various measures which could be decreed in the case of an emergency. The main problems facing the Republic in the suppression of insurrections and other emergencies were three-fold:

First, there was no standing army or police force which the state could use to maintain public order. 
Second, any use of force could be interfered with by tribunician intercession and citizen provocatio rights (the right to appeal magisterial coercive action to the people), making any use of force impossible. 
Third, deterrent by means of the criminal courts was both slow and unreliable, as they were often disrupted by political mobs.

Dictatorship

Senatus consultum ultimum 

Starting in 121 BC with the repression of Gaius Gracchus and his supporters, the Senate could urge magistrates to break the laws and employ force to suppress unspecified public enemies. Such decrees were similar to modern declarations of emergencies.

The decree's effect "was largely to provide political cover for a magistrate who went beyond the law in order to deal with a crisis". Actions taken under such decree were not legal or immunised, but magistrates prosecuted for crimes – usually the crime of killing a citizen without trial – committed in executing such a decree could escape punishment if they were able to justify their actions.

Tumultus 

A tumultus was a state of emergency declared under threat of hostile attack. During the duration of a tumultus, state officials wore military dress, all military leave was cancelled, and citizens were levied into the military. A iustitium also was normally declared, which suspended the legal jurisdiction of the magistrates "to enable the people to concentrate on raising an army". The authority to declare a tumultus usually rested with a dictator, if in office, or the Senate.

According to Cicero, the early Republic distinguished between two kinds of tumultus: a tumultus Italicus referring to a war in Italy – which in the late Republic meant a civil war – and a tumultus Gallicus referring to an attack by the Gauls. Tumults also were declared against slave uprisings and, in the late Republic, may have been declared by the Senate or on consular authority alone after passage of a senatus consultum ultimum. To that end, it was repurposed as a means to raise militias to put down armed insurrections.

In the middle Republic, the tumultus''' emergency levy was the only time that citizens without sufficient property to qualify for military service (the capite censi or proletarii) were enrolled into the military; in 281 BC, responding to the invasion of Pyrrhus, the levied proletarii were also first armed at state expense. In the later Republic, the declaration remained a means to admit volunteers and quickly raise an army for the duration of the emergency. For the declaration's duration, plebeian tribunes also were sometimes asked to turn a blind eye to enforcement of laws exempting certain classes of people, such as the elderly, from military service.

 Justitium 

During the duration of a justitium, all civilian public business – including the operation of the public treasury – was suspended "to enable the people to concentrate on raising an army". It was normally proclaimed by a magistrate – usually a consul or dictator – at the recommendation of the Senate. It could only be rescinded by the magistrate that proclaimed it. Proclamations of a justitium were usually concurrent with those of a tumultus, but could otherwise be declared at the start of a military campaign or war.

 Hostis declaration 

A hostis declaration was a statement by the Senate, sometimes ratified by a popular assembly, purporting to declare that certain named citizens were enemies of the state and were stripped of their citizenship rights. Stripping citizenship meant that a citizen could not raise provocatio (the right to appeal to the people against death penalties or physical punishment) and could be killed without trial.

The first men to be declared hostis were Gaius Marius and eleven of his supporters during Sulla's consulship in 88 BC; later, Sulla was voted hostis by the Senate under the domination of Lucius Cornelius Cinna. Its passage was controversial: Quintus Mucius Scaevola Augur objected to such a vote in the first instance against Marius, and later, some reformist senators sought not to attend meetings of the Senate such declarations were likely to be proposed.

 During the Empire 

The need for various declaration declined during the Principate. Because of the formation of the Praetorian Guard and a regular police force with the cohortes urbanae and vigiles, large-scale urban riots became more rare. Moreover, by the imperial period, "when it came to the more direct repression of rioters by troops, a detailed legal justification would in many cases have been unnecessary".

A declaration that someone was hostis, however, persisted in "a few occasions when it was not possible to apprehend immediately a rebel or an emperor who had been toppled". The emergence of autocratic rule also degraded the normal protections available to Roman citizens. Hostis'' declarations also were used against provincial revolts, which had the effect of classifying provincial rebellions in terms of foreign wars rather than internal security measures.

See also 
 State of emergency
 Roman citizenship

Notes

References

Citations

Sources 

 
 
 
 
 

 
 

Roman law
Ancient Roman government